Piñeres is one of 18 parishes (administrative divisions)  in Aller, a municipality within the province and autonomous community of Asturias, in northern Spain.

The villages include: Arteos, Las Barrosas, Bello, La Biesca, El Cabanon, Cambrosio, La Cantera, Carrocera, Casares, La Casillina, Castandiello, Castiello, Corigos, La Cortina, Cubrenes, El Escobio, Fresnaza, El Lagar, Llameres, Longalendo, Misiegos, Murias, El Palacio, El Pandiello, Perea, Pineo, La Provía, El Pueblu, Rucastiello, La Roza, San Antonio, La Sierra, Las Tercias, Valdediós, Vegalatorre, Veguellina, La Venta and Villar.

External links
 Official website 

Parishes in Aller
Astures